Luonnonmaa is an island in the city of Naantali, in south-western Finland. It forms most of the city's area, but only a fraction of its population as it is rather sparsely populated. It previously belonged to the rural municipality of Naantali (Naantalin maalaiskunta), but the municipality was annexed to the city of Naantali in 1964. The island hosts the Kultaranta Castle, the official summer residence of the Finnish President of the Republic.
The island contains a total of 10 villages:  Haijainen, Kaivola, Isokylä, Keitilä, Kirstilä, Kukola, Kultaranta, Käkölä, Viiala and Viialanranta.

Finnish islands in the Baltic
Naantali
Landforms of Southwest Finland